This is a list of the archdeacons of Meirionnydd. The Archdeacon of Meirionydd is the priest in charge of the archdeaconry of Meirionydd, an administrative division of the Church in Wales Diocese of Bangor. The archdeaconry comprises the five deaneries of Ardudwy, Arwystili, Cyfeiliog/Mawddwy, Llyn/Eifionydd and Ystumaner.

Archdeacons of Meirionydd

Medieval period
(1328)(1331) Tudur ap Adda
1358-1387 Samuel de Wyk
1387 - John Sloley
-1404 John ap Rhys
1404- John Fychan
1405 Gruffydd Young
-1410 (Matthew Peyworden (alias Wotton)
1410- Roger Hungarten
1416- John Estcourt
1436 Richard Gele
1485 Richard Bulkeley

Modern period
1504 Richard Bromfield
?-1524 William Glyn (afterwards Archdeacon of Anglesey, 1524)
1524-1562 William Roberts
1562-1566 Nicholas Robinson, then held in commendam to 1573 (afterwards Bishop of Bangor, 1566)
1574-1576 Humphrey Robinson
1576-1623 Edmund Prys
1623-1657 Robert White
1660–1666 Robert Morgan (afterwards Bishop of Bangor, 1666)
1666-1668 John Lloyd
1668-1672 William Lloyd (later Bishop of Llandaff, 1675)
1672-1676 Simon Lloyd
1676-1680 Michael Hughes
1680-1683 Hugh Pugh
1683-1713 Francis Lloyd,
1713-1716 Lancelot Bulkley
1716 Richard Langford
1733 Hugh Wynne
1754 John Ellis
1785 John Roberts
1802-1809 Peter Williams
1809-1834 John Jones
1834-1857 Richard Newcombe
1857-1866 Henry Weir White (deceased)
1866-1891 John Evans (deceased)
1891-1906 Thomas Williams (deceased)
1906-1931 John Lloyd Jones
1931-1940 Thomas Williams
1940-1952 David Jenkins
1952-1953 John Rhys Davies (deceased)
1953-1959 Henry Williams
1959-1976 Wallis Thomas
1976-1983 Thomas Bayley Hughes (afterwards Archdeacon of Bangor)
1983-1986 Elwyn Roberts (afterwards Archdeacon of Bangor, 1986)
1986-1993 Barry Morgan (afterwards Bishop of Bangor, 1993)
1993-1999 Saunders Davies (afterwards Bishop of Bangor, 2000)
2000-2002 Carl Cooper (afterwards Bishop of St David's, 2002)
2002-2004 Arfon Williams
2004-2010 Emyr Rowlands
2010–present Andrew Jones

References

Sources
British history online
:s:Page:Fasti ecclesiae Anglicanae Vol.1 body of work.djvu/158
:s:Page:Fasti ecclesiae Anglicanae Vol.1 body of work.djvu/159

Merioneth
 
Merioneth